George Hanger may refer to:

 George Hanger, 4th Baron Coleraine (1751–1824), British soldier, author, and eccentric
 George Wallace William Hanger (1866–1935), labor negotiator for the Federal Board of Mediation and Conciliation